Alton is a surname. Notable people with the surname include:

David Alton, Baron Alton of Liverpool (born 1951), British politician
Ernest Alton (1873–1952), Irish professor and politician
John Alton (1901–1996), American Academy Award-winning cinematographer
Joseph W. Alton (1919–2013), American politician and state senator
Robert Alton (1906–1957), American dancer and choreographer
Roger Alton (born 1947), British journalist and former editor of The Independent

See also
D'Alton
Elton (name), given name and surname